Wisconsin is a constituent state of the United States of America.

Wisconsin may also refer to:

Schools 
 University of Wisconsin System, the public university system in the state of Wisconsin
 University of Wisconsin–Madison, the flagship campus of this system
 Wisconsin Lutheran College

Ships 
 USS Wisconsin (BB-9), a battleship launched in 1898
 USS Wisconsin (BB-64), a battleship launched in 1943
 USS Wisconsin (SSBN-827), a planned ballistic missile submarine
 SS Wisconsin, a steamboat that sank in Lake Michigan in 1929

Places 
 Wisconsin Dells, Wisconsin, a city
 Wisconsin Junction, Wisconsin, an unincorporated community
 Wisconsin Rapids, Wisconsin, a city
 Lake Wisconsin, Wisconsin, a census-designated place
 Wisconsin River, a river in the state of Wisconsin
 Wisconsin Territory, a U.S. territory from 1836 to 1848
 Wisconsin Township, Jackson County, Minnesota
 Wisconsin Range, a mountain range in Antarctica

Transport 
 Wisconsin Coach Lines, a commuter bus service
 Air Wisconsin (airline call sign "Wisconsin")

Other uses 
 Wisconsin glaciation, most recent glaciation event in North America
 Wisconsin Avenue, a street in Washington, D.C.
 Wisconsin Center, a convention and exhibition center in downtown Milwaukee, Wisconsin
 Wisconsin (album), a 1987 album by The Crucifucks
 Wisconsin (statue), a statue by Daniel Chester French, on top of the Wisconsin Capitol Building in Madison

See also
 Wisconsin Plan, a proposal to end World War I